Presidential elections were held in Liberia in May 1883. Only one candidate, Hilary R. W. Johnson, contested the election, and was supported by both the True Whig Party and the Republican Party. Following the election, Johnson declared himself to be a True Whig. He took office on 7 January 1884.

References

Liberia
1883 in Liberia
Elections in Liberia
Single-candidate elections
May 1883 events
Election and referendum articles with incomplete results